
This is a complete List of National Historic Landmarks in Utah. The United States National Historic Landmark program is operated under the auspices of the National Park Service, and recognizes structures, districts, objects, and similar resources according to a list of criteria of national significance. The state of Utah is home to 14 of these landmarks, tying together a wide range of historic threads.

The table below lists all 14 of these sites, along with added detail and description.

|}

See also

 List of U.S. National Historic Landmarks by state
 National Register of Historic Places listings in Utah
 Historic preservation
 National Register of Historic Places
 History of Utah

References

External links

 National Historic Landmark Program at the National Park Service
 Lists of National Historic Landmarks

Utah
 
National Historic Landmarks
National Historic Landmarks